Pura Luhur Batukaru is a Hindu temple in Tabanan, Bali, Indonesia. Located on the southern slope of Mount Batukaru, Bali's second-highest volcano, the temple is one of nine kayangan jagat (directional temples) meant to protect Bali from evil spirits. Originally built during the 11th century, Pura Luhur Batukaru was dedicated to the ancestors of the rajas of Tabanan. It was destroyed in 1604, but rebuilt in 1959. The temple's most important shrine is a 7-tiered meru dedicated to Mahadewa, the God of Mount Batukaru.

Today, Pura Luhur Batukaru remains an extremely sacred site for Bali's Hindu population. Many of the complex's grounds remain off-limits to visitors for various ceremonies and events throughout the year. The temple is also the first stop one must take before ascending to the summit of Mount Batukaru. A pilgrimage takes place to the peak once a year, and may see thousands of worshipers walk its trails at once.

External links
Pura Luhur Batukaru on Global Heritage Network
Site description on whyGo Bali (tourism blog)

References

Balinese sea temples
Hindu temples in Indonesia
Cultural Properties of Indonesia in Bali